Central Highway may refer to:
Central Highway (Cuba)
Central Cross-Island Highway in New Zealand

See also
Autopista Central, Chile